Rachicerus is a genus of flies in the family Xylophagidae.

Species
Rachicerus amorosus Nagatomi, 1982
Rachicerus anachoreticus Nagatomi, 1982
Rachicerus aterrimus Senior-White, 1924
Rachicerus bellus Osten Sacken, 1886
Rachicerus bicolor Brunetti, 1912
Rachicerus bifidus Nagatomi, 1970
Rachicerus bilineus (Walker, 1861)
Rachicerus boarius Nagatomi, 1970
Rachicerus brevicornis Kertész, 1914
Rachicerus carrerai Pujol-Luz, 2019
Rachicerus endymion Nagatomi, 1970
Rachicerus fenestratus Kertész, 1914
Rachicerus flabellum Nagatomi, 1970
Rachicerus flavomaculatus (Leonard, 1930)
Rachicerus fluidus Nagatomi, 1970
Rachicerus formosus (Loew, 1850)
Rachicerus fulvicollis Walker, 1854
Rachicerus fulvicornis (Snellen van Vollenhoven, 1863)
Rachicerus galloisi Séguy, 1948
Rachicerus guttatus Nagatomi, 1970
Rachicerus hainanensis Yang & Yang, 2002
Rachicerus honestus Osten Sacken, 1877
Rachicerus kotoshensis Nagatomi, 1970
Rachicerus lanei Carrera, 1940
Rachicerus lepidus Nagatomi, 1982
Rachicerus lopesi Carrera, 1940
Rachicerus maai Nagatomi, 1970
Rachicerus maculipennis Frey, 1954
Rachicerus marcusi Carrera, 1940
Rachicerus miyatakei Nagatomi, 1970
Rachicerus nigellus Nagatomi, 1970
Rachicerus niger Leonard, 1930
Rachicerus nigricornis Brunetti, 1920
Rachicerus nigrinus Wandolleck, 1897
Rachicerus nigripalpus Loew, 1874
Rachicerus nimbosus Nagatomi, 1970
Rachicerus nitidus Johnson, 1903
Rachicerus obatratus Nagatomi, 1970
Rachicerus obscuripennis Loew, 1863
Rachicerus oliverioi Carrera, 1940
Rachicerus omissinervis Meijere, 1916
Rachicerus opiparus Nagatomi, 1970
Rachicerus opulentus Nagatomi, 1970
Rachicerus orientalis Ôuchi, 1938
Rachicerus pantherinus Nagatomi, 1970
Rachicerus patagiatus Enderlein, 1913
Rachicerus pauciarticulatus Frey, 1954
Rachicerus picticornis Kertész, 1923
Rachicerus pictipennis Kertész, 1914
Rachicerus pilosus (Frey, 1954)
Rachicerus plagosus Nagatomi, 1970
Rachicerus proximus Kertész, 1914
Rachicerus pullus Nagatomi, 1970
Rachicerus quatei Nagatomi, 1982
Rachicerus relictus (Frey, 1954)
Rachicerus robinsoni Edwards, 1919
Rachicerus robustus Frey, 1954
Rachicerus rusticus Nagatomi, 1970
Rachicerus sakishimanus Nagatomi, 1982
Rachicerus samuelsoni Nagatomi, 1982
Rachicerus shannoni Carrera, 1945
Rachicerus solivagus Nagatomi, 1970
Rachicerus spissus Nagatomi, 1970
Rachicerus steffani Nagatomi, 1982
Rachicerus tenuiculus Nagatomi, 1970
Rachicerus tenuis Nagatomi, 1970
Rachicerus tigrinus Nagatomi, 1970
Rachicerus tristis Loew, 1869
Rachicerus unicinctus Brunetti, 1920
Rachicerus varipes Loew, 1863
Rachicerus varius Nagatomi, 1970
Rachicerus zonatus Osten Sacken, 1881

References

Xylophagidae
Brachycera genera
Taxa named by Francis Walker (entomologist)
Diptera of Australasia
Diptera of Asia
Diptera of North America
Diptera of South America